Highway 3 (AR 3, Ark. 3, Hwy. 3, formerly State Road 3) was a state highway in southern Arkansas. It was maintained by the Arkansas Highway Department (AHD), now known as the Arkansas Department of Transportation (ArDOT).

Between Magnolia and Lehi, Highway 3 was replaced in 1935 by US 79, splitting Highway 3 into 2 sections; one segment south of Lehi later became Highway 147 and Highway 50. In late 1936, Highway 3 had a third segment added between McNeil and Waldo. In 1939, the segment between Magnolia and the Louisiana state line was transferred to Highway 19. In mid-1940, the segment north of Lehi was replaced by Highway 147, and the segment from McNeil to Waldo was renumbered Highway 98.

See also

References

External links

Camden, Arkansas
Camden, Arkansas micropolitan area
Fordyce, Arkansas
003
Transportation in Arkansas County, Arkansas
Transportation in Calhoun County, Arkansas
Transportation in Cleveland County, Arkansas
Transportation in Columbia County, Arkansas
Transportation in Crittenden County, Arkansas
Transportation in Dallas County, Arkansas
Transportation in Jefferson County, Arkansas
Transportation in Lee County, Arkansas
Transportation in Monroe County, Arkansas
Transportation in Ouachita County, Arkansas
Transportation in Pine Bluff, Arkansas
Transportation in Prairie County, Arkansas
Transportation in St. Francis County, Arkansas
U.S. Route 79
1926 establishments in Arkansas
1940 disestablishments in Arkansas